Purchaman may refer to:

 Pur Chaman District, a mountainous district in Farah Province, Afghanistan
 That Purchaman, a village in Pur Chaman District